James F. Harcourt House is a historic home located in Orange Township, Rush County, Indiana.  It was built in 1880–1881, and is a two-story, irregular cruciform plan frame dwelling with Italianate and Second Empire style design elements.  It features a mansard roof with two dormers and a two-story hexagonal bay.  Also on the property are the contributing original farmhouse (c. 1867) and traverse frame barn.

It was listed on the National Register of Historic Places in 1989.

References

Houses on the National Register of Historic Places in Indiana
Second Empire architecture in Indiana
Italianate architecture in Indiana
Houses completed in 1881
Buildings and structures in Rush County, Indiana
National Register of Historic Places in Rush County, Indiana
1881 establishments in Indiana